Stan Bisset MC OAM (27 August 1912 – 5 October 2010) was an Australian national representative rugby union player and military officer who saw active service in the Second World War.

Early life
Bisset was born in St Kilda, Victoria on 27 August 1912. He was a promising Australian Rules football ruckman before being persuaded to play rugby.

Rugby union career
A second-rower, goal-kicker and captain, Bisset played with the Power House Rugby Club in Melbourne. During his tenure as first grade captain at Power House Bisset steered the side to two first grade premierships in 1935 and 1936, before earning Victorian selection the following year. Bisset played in the last Victorian XV to beat the Warratahs in a fixture at Manly Oval in 1937, and represented Victoria against the Springboks the same year.  He was one of four Victorians who were selected for the ill-fated 1939 Wallaby tour of Great Britain that was captained by Vay Wilson. The team docked at Southampton on the day when England declared war and after a couple of weeks spent filling sandbags to start the war effort, the squad set sail for Australia having not played a game. Of the unlucky tourists, only Bill McLean, Keith Windon and Len Smith would return to footballing success after the war.

Second World War
Stan and the team returned home where he joined the 2/14th Battalion joining his older brother Hal, known as Butch.  Stan was a lieutenant in charge of an intelligence section while Butch was a platoon commander. Both men saw service in the Middle East before Australian forces returned to the South West Pacific in 1942 to defend Australia against the Japanese push through Papua New Guinea on the Kokoda Track.

After arriving in Papua New Guinea, Stan and Butch were sent up the Kokoda Track to relieve the 39th Battalion who were holding out the Japanese at Isurava. During the battle Stan was wounded by a bullet which grazed an eyebrow, and Butch was wounded in action on the Kokoda Track and died in Stan's arms in 1942. Butch was buried on the Track.

Stan was awarded the Military Cross for actions during the attack on Palliers Hill in the Markham and Ramu valleys in September 1943.

Honours
On 12 June 2000 Stan was granted a Medal of the Order of Australia for service to veterans particularly those of the 2/14th Battalion, 7th Division.

Later life
Stan died on 5 October 2010 at a nursing home in Coolum, Queensland. He is survived by his wife Gloria, and his children, Sally, James, Holly, Tom and Ros.

References

Further reading
WA Today obituary

External links
 Rugby Heaven obituary
 

1912 births
2010 deaths
Australian rugby union players
Recipients of the Medal of the Order of Australia
Recipients of the Military Cross
Australian Army personnel of World War II
Australian Army officers
Rugby union players from Melbourne
People from St Kilda, Victoria
Military personnel from Melbourne